Nehemia Sirkis (22 March 1932– March 2018) was an Israeli sports shooter and firearms designer.

Background
Sirkis competed at the 1964 Summer Olympics and the 1968 Summer Olympics. He also competed at the 1966 and 1970 Asian Games.  Sirkis was a member of the Israeli national shooting team for 20 years and won the Israeli title seven times during his athletic career. 

In later years, Sirkis became a noted designer of various US and Israeli firearms, including the Detonics Pocket 9 and the  Dan sniper rifle.

References

1932 births
Living people
Israeli male sport shooters
Olympic shooters of Israel
Shooters at the 1964 Summer Olympics
Shooters at the 1968 Summer Olympics
Sportspeople from Tel Aviv
Asian Games medalists in shooting
Shooters at the 1966 Asian Games
Shooters at the 1970 Asian Games
Asian Games gold medalists for Israel
Asian Games silver medalists for Israel
Asian Games bronze medalists for Israel
Medalists at the 1966 Asian Games
Medalists at the 1970 Asian Games